"Candy Paint" is a song by American rapper and singer Post Malone from the soundtrack of the 2017 action film The Fate of the Furious. The track was released by Republic Records on October 20, 2017, as the second single from Malone's second studio album, Beerbongs & Bentleys (2018). The song was released alongside the film and the rest of the soundtrack for the film.

Background
Aside from references to rides, "Candy Paint" also mentions Michael Scott, the Dunder Mifflin boss from The Office played by Steve Carell.

Chart performance
"Candy Paint" debuted at number 84 on the Billboard Hot 100, later peaking at number 34.

Charts

Weekly charts

Year-end charts

Certifications

References

External links

2017 songs
2017 singles
Post Malone songs
Republic Records singles
Songs written by Post Malone
Songs written for films
Fast & Furious music
Songs written by Louis Bell
Song recordings produced by Louis Bell
Song recordings produced by Post Malone